Maria Sharapova was the defending champion and successfully defender her title, by defeating Mashona Washington 6–0, 6–1 in the final.

Seeds
The first two seeds received a bye into the second round.

Draw

Finals

Top half

Bottom half

References

External links
 Official results archive (ITF)
 Official results archive (WTA)

2004 Japan Open Tennis Championships